is a trolleybus station in Tateyama, Nakaniikawa District, Toyama Prefecture, Japan. The station offers views of Kurobe Dam.

Lines
Tateyama Kurobe Kankō
Kanden Tunnel Trolleybus (Tateyama Kurobe Alpine Route)

Adjacent stations

Railway stations in Toyama Prefecture